State elections were held in South Australia on 6 November 1982. All 47 seats in the South Australian House of Assembly were up for election. The incumbent Liberal Party of Australia led by Premier of South Australia David Tonkin was defeated by the Australian Labor Party led by Leader of the Opposition John Bannon.

A referendum on daylight saving was held on the same day, and was passed.

Background
Parliamentary elections for both houses of the Parliament of South Australia were held in South Australia in 1982, which saw John Bannon and the Australian Labor Party defeat the incumbent Liberal Party of Australia led by David Tonkin, after one term in power.

As Premier, Tonkin combined fiscal conservatism with socially progressive reforms. In the former, Tonkin made significant cuts to the public service, earning him the enmity of the unions, while an example of the latter was the passage of the land rights bill and the return to the Pitjantjatjara people of 10 per cent of South Australia's area.

Prior to the election, Tonkin removed Robin Millhouse (a former Liberal member who had defected to the Liberal Movement and then the Australian Democrats, and whose popularity enabled him to hold his seat of Mitcham) with an offer of a vacant seat in the Supreme Court. However the subsequent by-election saw the seat retained by Democrats candidate Heather Southcott.

One potential election factor was the copper and uranium mine at Olympic Dam, near Roxby Downs. Enabling legislation had been passed earlier in 1982, despite the opposition of the Labor Party, only when Norm Foster quit the Labor party to support it. Considered a controversial move in Labor circles, Bannon defused this as an election issue by promising that development would go ahead under a Labor government (a commitment which was honoured), despite having previously opposed it.

The Liberals also had to contend with the early 1980s recession.

Summary

Labor achieved a 5.9% swing, and won 4 seats from the Liberals (Brighton, Henley Beach, Mawson and Newland). The Liberals won the seat of Mitcham from the Democrats, so overall lost 3 seats. The House of Assembly numbers were Labor 24, Liberal 21, National Party 1 and Independent Labor 1, giving Labor a narrow majority.

In the Legislative Council, Liberal and Labor won 5 seats each, and the Democrats 1; giving a chamber of 11 Liberal, 9 Labor and 2 Democrats. Labor lost one seat to the Democrats, but regained the seat they had lost when Norm Foster resigned from the Labor party earlier that year. Foster stood as an Independent Labor member in the Legislative Council, but was not re-elected.

Aftermath

After the election loss, Tonkin resigned as Liberal leader and was succeeded by John Olsen, who won a leadership ballot against Dean Brown. A heart complaint caused Tonkin to leave parliament soon after at which a 1983 Bragg by-election was triggered, with the Liberals easily retaining the seat.

A 1984 Elizabeth by-election saw Independent Labor candidate Martyn Evans win the seat from Labor. This gave Labor a minority government (23 out of 47 seats), though it continued to govern with the support of Independent Labor members Evans and Norm Peterson.

Key dates
 Issue of writ: 18 October 1982
 Close of nominations: 26 October 1982
 Polling day: 6 November 1982
 Return of writ: On or before 4 December 1982

Results

House of Assembly

|}

Seats changing hands

Legislative Council

|}

Post-election pendulum

See also
 Results of the South Australian state election, 1982 (House of Assembly)
 Results of the 1982 South Australian state election (Legislative Council)
 Members of the South Australian House of Assembly, 1982-1985
 Members of the South Australian Legislative Council, 1982-1985

References

External links
Historical lower house results
Historical upper house results
State and federal election results  in Australia since 1890

Elections in South Australia
1982 elections in Australia
1980s in South Australia
November 1982 events in Australia